Ben Moolhuysen (12 September 1896 – 12 December 1959) was a Dutch architect. His work was part of the architecture event in the art competition at the 1936 Summer Olympics.

References

1896 births
1959 deaths
20th-century Dutch architects
Olympic competitors in art competitions
Architects from Amsterdam